Solbergelva is a village in Drammen municipality, part of the Viken county, Norway. The village lies north of Drammenselva, approx. 5 miles west of Bragernes square, between Åssiden in the east and Krokstadelva in the west with Solbergfjellet north. It is part of Drammen municipality and has about 6.000 inhabitants in 2017.

In the center of Solbergelva lies Solberg skole, Killingrud ungdomsskole, Solbergsentret, Solberg sport-og kultursenter, sports facilities, Solberg kapell and Solberg spinderi.

Annually Solbergelva hosts Solbergfestivalen, its own festival at the end of May. 

Solberg SK is one of the leading bandy teams in Norway.

History 
The name stems from the farm Solberg and describes in part a hill where the sun goes down.

Solberg spinderi 
Solberg Spinderi was founded in 1818 under the name Drammens Bomuldsspinneri. The enterprise was founded by Hovel Helseth and three other Drammen merchants who were supporters of the lay preacher Hans Nielsen Hauge. In 1821 the company moved to Solbergelva in order to be able to take advantage of hydropower resources.

The history of Solbergelva is closely linked to the company Solberg Spinderi, which for many years employed a substantial part of the local workforce and were responsible for the development of housing for the employees. Around the company there was a separate community with schools, chapels, housing and social care. Solberg spinderi is one of Norway's oldest companies and is still located in Solbergelva.

Gallery

Notable people 

 Renate Reinsve, actress

References

External links
Stiftelsen Verkstedet
Solbergfestivalen

Geography of Viken (county)